I Do is a 2010 Filipino romantic comedy film produced and released by Star Cinema. The film was released in the Philippines on September 29, 2010.

Plot
Mayumi (Erich Gonzales) is a girl with a happy disposition in life who dreams of meeting her "the one" someday. She has been dreaming of meeting her "the one" and having the perfect wedding ever since she was a little girl. When she meets Lance (Enchong Dee), a Chinese descendant, in a wedding, she immediately knows that he is "the one" she is waiting for, her faith and destiny. The two of them become lovers despite the unwillingness of their families to their relationship.

The unsupportiveness of Lance's family was shown during a birthday party, where Mayumi wore a blue dress while everyone else in the party wore red. (During celebrations, it is customary for the Chinese to wear red attires.) Lance's family talked about how she was very different in front of her in Chinese. They also tell Lance about how inappropriate his companion is.

One day, Mayumi tells her friends about her current condition, about how she recently seems to be very choosy of what to eat and also how she always feels like urinating. Her friends immediately accompany her to the drugstore, thinking of the possibility that she might be pregnant. Turns out, Mayumi is pregnant. Her family, especially her father, is very disappointed of her and tells her to move out. Mayumi temporarily lives in Lance's house. She is forced to marry Lance. Although Mayumi loves the idea of becoming Lance's bride, Lance on the other hand has doubts on Mayumi becoming his wife. He doesn't have enough money for the extravagant wedding that Mayumi wants, since his family is not very supportive on the idea of him marrying a Filipino and also because the baby is not a boy. Being Chinese, Lance is obliged to marry also a girl of Chinese descent to keep the Chinese blood tradition. Mayumi's family on the other hand felt they were betrayed because Lance promised to marry Mayumi because of their love child. Is marrying someone because of a baby worthy of saying "I do"?

Cast

 Erich Gonzales - Mayumi "Yumi" Punongbayan-Tan 
 Enchong Dee - Lance Anderson "Lance" Tan
 Pokwang - Nenita Punongbayan 
 Melai Cantiveros - Marian
 Dennis Padilla - Caloy Punongbayan 
 Janus Del Prado - Bernard
 Nash Aguas - Dakila Punongbayan
 Jun Urbano  - Angkong
 Ricardo Cepeda - Edison Tan
 Isay Alvarez - Vivian Tan
 Eliza Pineda - Sharleen Tan
 Alwyn Uytingco - Alemberg
 Jane Oineza - Awit
 Allyson Lualhati - April
 Che Ramos - Mildred Tan
 Joyce So - Shiela
 John Manalo as young Lance Anderson "Lance Tan
 Joem Bascon as young Edison Tan
 Katya Santos as young Vivian Tan
 Barbie Sabino as young Sharleen Tan

Reception

International screenings
The film had international screenings on October 1, 2010, in select cities in the United States such as Las Vegas, NV, San Francisco, CA, Los Angeles, CA, San Diego, CA, Seattle, WA,  Bergenfield, NJ, Milpitas, CA, Chicago, IL. It will also have screenings in Guam.

Soundtrack
The official theme song is titled "Kahit Habang Buhay", which is sung by Yeng Constantino and Sam Milby.
Another song that was played during the film is titled "Kasama", which is sung by Aiza Seguerra.

References

External links
 
 

2010 films
Filipino-language films
Star Cinema films
Star Cinema comedy films
Philippine romantic comedy films
Films directed by Veronica Velasco